is a Christian private girls' secondary school in Naka-ku, Yokohama, Japan,

It was founded on September 13, 1947, as a post-World War II combination of a former Shinto girls' senior high school and a Buddhist girls' senior high school and was established by Tadashi Kaneko (died 2000).  the teaching staff numbers over 100 and the student body numbers over 1,000.

References

External links
 Yokohama Jogakuin Girls School
 
 Yokohama Jogakuin Junior and Senior High School 

Christian schools in Japan
Girls' schools in Japan
Schools in Yokohama
High schools in Yokohama
1947 establishments in Japan
Educational institutions established in 1947
Naka-ku, Yokohama